In the Chamber of Bliss (Traditional Chinese: 蔡鍔與小鳳仙) is an TVB period drama series, starring Damian Lau, Kathy Chow, Kenneth Ma, Angela Tong and Toby Leung as the main leads.

Cast

Plot

Military Governor Choi Ngok (Damian Lau) has been attempting to overthrow the Yuen Sai Hoi government. To facilitate his plan to stage an uprising in Yunnan, he pretends to be fooling around with the highly sought-after courtesan Cheung Feng Wan (Chow Hoi Mei), nicknamed Siu Fung Sin, to avoid detection. Yuen Sai Hoi (Law Lok Lam), who is suspicious of Ngok, sends the Chief of Staff Mok Yik Tin (Lam Ka Wah) to spy on him. Later he even lures Ngok's wife Pak Sz Ting (Tin Yui Nei) to Beijing, hoping that this will force Ngok to pledge his loyalty to the government. To ensure the success of the revolutionary movement, Ngok carries on with his affair with Wan as a camouflage, without realizing that she has seriously fallen in love with him. Wan is ready to give up everything just to be with Ngok while he remains cold and distant towards her.

Awards and nominations
TVB Anniversary Awards (2009)
 Best Drama
 Best Actor (Damian Lau)
 Best Supporting Actor (Dominic Lam)
 Best Supporting Actress (Angela Tong)

Viewership ratings

References

External links
TVB.com In the Chamber of Bliss - Official Website 
K for TVB series Screencaptures & Synopsis - 

TVB dramas
2009 Hong Kong television series debuts
2009 Hong Kong television series endings